Pierre Haarhoff (born 9 July 1932) is a French former athlete who competed in the 1956 Summer Olympics.

References

1932 births
Living people
People from Haguenau
French male sprinters
Olympic athletes of France
Athletes (track and field) at the 1956 Summer Olympics
Athletes (track and field) at the 1955 Mediterranean Games
Mediterranean Games gold medalists for France
Mediterranean Games medalists in athletics
Sportspeople from Bas-Rhin